Proceratophrys concavitympanum is a species of frog in the family Odontophrynidae.  It is endemic to Brazil and known from Rondônia, northwestern Mato Grosso, Pará, and Tocantins. It is the only Proceratophrys found in the Amazon rainforest.

Description
Adult males measure  and adult females  in snout–vent length. The head is wider than it is long, almost semi-circular when viewed from above. The tympanum is visible as a depression in skin (hence the specific name concavitympanum, from Latin concavum for concave). The fingers have no webbing whereas the toes are basally webbed. The upper eyelids have large, irregular warts laterally, becoming less prominent medially. Symmetric crests of warts run from the behind the eyelids to the sacral area. Dorsal coloration is cryptic and resembles a dead leaf. The base color is pale yellow; the crests of warts are gray and bordered with gray lacework. The head has two gray mottled areas. The underside is pale pink, possibly with gray reticulations.

Tadpoles in Gosner stage 36 measure  in snout–vent length.

Habitat and conservation
Proceratophrys concavitympanum have been found in forest environments along margin of a permanent pond, and near or in small temporary streams with sandy beds. Tadpoles develop in water.

The conservation status of this species was considered "data deficient" in 2004. Later observations have greatly expanded its known range. Some records are from protected areas, including the Tapirapé Biological Reserve and Riozinho do Anfrísio Extractive Reserve.

References

concavitympanum
Endemic fauna of Brazil
Amphibians of Brazil
Amphibians described in 2000
Taxonomy articles created by Polbot